Zálesie is a village and municipality in western Slovakia in Senec District in the Bratislava Region.

History
In historical records the village was first mentioned in 1260.

Geography
The municipality lies at an altitude of 128 metres and covers an area of 5.87 km².

Demographics
According to the 2015 census, the municipality had 1,898 inhabitants. 1,429 of inhabitants were Slovaks, 16 Hungarians, 12 Czechs and 58 others and unspecified.

References

External links/Sources

 Official page
http://www.statistics.sk/mosmis/eng/run.html

Villages and municipalities in Senec District